Rafael Cordeiro (born June 1, 1973) is a Brazilian mixed martial arts (MMA) coach and founder of MMA Gym, Kings MMA. He is best known for training multiple MMA world champions.

History
Cordeiro was a fighter affiliated with the Chute Boxe Academy where he participated in mixed martial arts and Muay Thai. He was three-time Brazilian Muay Thai champion and lightweight champion at the International Vale Tudo Championship (IVC).

In 1999, Cordeiro stopped competing professionally and started his career as a full time coach at Chute Boxe where would remain until 2009. In 2008 he moved to the United States and in 2010 opened his own gym, Kings MMA in Huntington Beach, California.

Cordeiro has won the 2012 and 2016 coach of the year awards for MMA.

In 2019, during the weigh-ins for UFC 244, the NYSAC "determined that Kelvin Gastelum made contact with another person while on the scale, a violation of the weigh in policy”. This was because he was in contact with Cordeiro, who was his coach for the bout. As a result, Gastelum and Rafael Cordeiro were fined $1,000 and $200 respectively by New York State Athletic Commission.

In 2020, Cordeiro was trainer and cornerman to the former boxing world heavyweight champion, Mike Tyson for his exhibition bout against Roy Jones Jr.

Notable students

Mixed martial arts
 Anderson Silva - Former UFC Middleweight Champion
 Maurício Rua -Former UFC Light Heavyweight  Champion and 2005 PRIDE Middleweight Grand Prix Champion
 Wanderlei Silva - Former PRIDE Middleweight Champion and the 2003 PRIDE Middleweight Grand Prix Tournament Champion
 Fabrício Werdum -Former UFC Heavyweight Champion
 Rafael dos Anjos -Former UFC Lightweight Champion
 Cris Cyborg -Former UFC Women's Featherweight  Champion
 Lyoto Machida -Former UFC Light Heavyweight  Champion
 Murilo Rua- Former EliteXC Middleweight Champion
 Beneil Dariush- Former RITC Lightweight Champion
 Marvin Vettori- Former VFC Welterweight Champion
 Kelvin Gastelum
 Giga Chikadze

Boxing
 Mike Tyson -Undisputed world heavyweight champion from 1987 to 1990

Championships and accomplishments 

 International Vale Tudo Championship
 IVC Lightweight Championship (One time)
World MMA Awards
 2012  The Shawn Tompkins Coach of the Year
 2015  The Shawn Tompkins Coach of the Year

Mixed martial arts record

|-
| Loss
| align=center| 4–2
| Rumina Sato
| Submission (kneebar)
| VTJ 1999 - Vale Tudo Japan 1999
| 
| align=center| 1
| align=center| 0:58
| Japan
| 
|-
| Win
| align=center| 4–1
| Henry Matamoros
| Decision (unanimous)
| IVC 9 - The Revenge
| 
| align=center| 1
| align=center| 30:00
| Brazil
| 
|-
| Loss
| align=center| 3–1
| Sergio Melo
| DQ (rope grabbing)
| IVC 7 - The New Champions
| 
| align=center| 1
| align=center| 11:32
| Brazil
| 
|-
| Win
| align=center| 3–0
| Altair de Oliveira
| Submission (rear-naked choke)
| BVF 4 - Circuito de Lutas 7
| 
| align=center| 1
| align=center| 2:24
| Brazil
| 
|-
| Win
| align=center| 2–0
| Cosminho da Silva
| Submission (rear-naked choke)
| BVF 4 - Circuito de Lutas 7
| 
| align=center| 1
| align=center| 3:38
| Brazil
| 
|-
| Win
| align=center| 1–0
| Daniel Daniel
| TKO (cut)
| CP X CB - Capoeira vs. Chute Boxe
| 
| align=center| 1
| align=center| 0:42
| Brazil
|

References 

1973 births
Living people
Sportspeople from Curitiba
Brazilian male mixed martial artists
Lightweight mixed martial artists
Mixed martial artists utilizing Muay Thai
Mixed martial artists utilizing Brazilian jiu-jitsu
Mixed martial arts trainers
Brazilian Muay Thai practitioners
Brazilian practitioners of Brazilian jiu-jitsu
People awarded a black belt in Brazilian jiu-jitsu
Brazilian expatriate sportspeople in the United States